The women's 3 metre springboard was presented to the Olympic Games for the first time as one of five diving events on the diving at the 1920 Summer Olympics programme. The competition was held on Monday, 29 August 1920. Four divers, all from the United States, competed.

Results

The event was held on Monday, 29 August 1920.

Since there were only four entries, the divers and officials agreed to scratch the qualifying round and compete in a direct final.

References

External links
 

Women
1920
1920 in women's diving
Div